Adalbert Oster (born 4 March 1944) is a Romanian sports shooter. He competed in the mixed skeet event at the 1976 Summer Olympics.

References

1944 births
Living people
Romanian male sport shooters
Olympic shooters of Romania
Shooters at the 1976 Summer Olympics
Sportspeople from Timișoara